WLR may refer to:

 Wisconsin Law Review, a student-edited legal journal at the University of Wisconsin Law School
 Willandra Lakes Region, a World Heritage Site in New South Wales, Australia
 West Lancashire Railway, a disused railway in Lancashire, England
 WLR FM, a local radio station covering Waterford City and County in Ireland
 Washington Law Review, a student-edited legal journal at the University of Washington School of Law, USA
 Weekly Law Reports, an official periodical of United Kingdom case law published by the Incorporated Council of Law Reporting
 Weapon Locating Radar, an Indian Artillery detecting radar being developed by DRDO
 West Lincoln Road, a road in Miami Beach, Florida, USA
 Wholesale line rental, a type of telecommunications service
 WLR, the hull classification symbol of a river buoy tender used by the US Coast Guard
 Whole Lotta Red, the second studio album by rapper Playboi Carti, released in 2020